Charles H. Osborne (January 21, 1939 – April 17, 1979) was an American professional basketball player. He played college basketball for Western Kentucky University and played in the National Basketball Association for the Syracuse Nationals. In four career NBA games, he averaged 1.3 points, 2.3 rebounds and 0.3 assists.

Osborne was killed in an automobile accident on April 17, 1979.

References

External links
Charlie Osborne @ HilltopperHaven.com

1939 births
1979 deaths
American men's basketball players
Basketball players from Kentucky
Power forwards (basketball)
Road incident deaths in Kentucky
Syracuse Nationals draft picks
Syracuse Nationals players
Western Kentucky Hilltoppers basketball players